Jermaine Otto (born 2 August 1991) is an Antiguan cricketer. He made his List A debut for the Leeward Islands in the 2016–17 Regional Super50 on 29 January 2017. He made his first-class debut for the Leeward Islands in the 2016–17 Regional Four Day Competition on 11 March 2017.

References

External links
 

1991 births
Living people
Antigua and Barbuda cricketers
Leeward Islands cricketers
Place of birth missing (living people)